The following highways are numbered 3E:

United States
 Georgia State Route 3E (Atlanta–Marietta) (former)
 Georgia State Route 3E (Thomaston) (former)
 New York State Route 3E (former)
 Oklahoma State Highway 3E
 Secondary State Highway 3E (Washington) (former)